Onyx (formerly, Scodie) is a census-designated place (CDP) in Kern County, California, United States. The population was 475 at the 2010 census, down from 476 at the 2000 census.

Geography

History
The place was originally called Scodie in honor of William Scodie, who opened a store in 1861. The first post office at Onyx opened in 1889.

Demographics

2010
At the 2010 census Onyx had a population of 475. The racial makeup of Onyx was 406 (85.5%) White, 4 (0.8%) African American, 9 (1.9%) Native American, 0 (0.0%) Asian, 0 (0.0%) Pacific Islander, 16 (3.4%) from other races, and 40 (8.4%) from two or more races. Hispanic or Latino of any race were 30 people (6.3%).

The whole population lived in households, no one lived in non-institutionalized group quarters and no one was institutionalized.

There were 214 households, 40 (18.7%) had children under the age of 18 living in them, 89 (41.6%) were opposite-sex married couples living together, 19 (8.9%) had a female householder with no husband present, 13 (6.1%) had a male householder with no wife present.  There were 13 (6.1%) unmarried opposite-sex partnerships, and 1 (0.5%) same-sex married couples or partnerships. 82 households (38.3%) were one person and 44 (20.6%) had someone living alone who was 65 or older. The average household size was 2.22.  There were 121 families (56.5% of households); the average family size was 2.97.

The age distribution was 82 people (17.3%) under the age of 18, 28 people (5.9%) aged 18 to 24, 68 people (14.3%) aged 25 to 44, 184 people (38.7%) aged 45 to 64, and 113 people (23.8%) who were 65 or older.  The median age was 51.4 years. For every 100 females, there were 98.7 males.  For every 100 females age 18 and over, there were 98.5 males.

There were 295 housing units at an average density of 25.6 per square mile, of the occupied units 154 (72.0%) were owner-occupied and 60 (28.0%) were rented. The homeowner vacancy rate was 8.8%; the rental vacancy rate was 14.3%.  343 people (72.2% of the population) lived in owner-occupied housing units and 132 people (27.8%) lived in rental housing units.

2000
At the 2000 census there were 476 people, 197 households, and 128 families living in the CDP. There were 281 housing units at an average density of 24.3 per square mile (9.4/km). The racial makeup of the CDP was 93.49% White, 0.21% Black or African American, 1.89% Native American, 0.63% from other races, and 3.78% from two or more races.  4.62% of the population were Hispanic or Latino of any race.
Of the 197 households 22.8% had children under the age of 18 living with them, 48.7% were married couples living together, 9.6% had a female householder with no husband present, and 35.0% were non-families. 27.4% of households were one person and 14.2% were one person aged 65 or older.  The average household size was 2.42 and the average family size was 2.92.

The age distribution was 24.4% under the age of 18, 4.0% from 18 to 24, 19.5% from 25 to 44, 23.5% from 45 to 64, and 28.6% 65 or older.  The median age was 47 years. For every 100 females, there were 97.5 males.  For every 100 females age 18 and over, there were 92.5 males.

The median household income was $16,058 and the median family income  was $29,583. Males had a median income of $31,818 versus $13,438 for females. The per capita income for the CDP was $9,370.  About 25.7% of families and 34.7% of the population were below the poverty line, including 52.1% of those under age 18 and none of those age 65 or over.

Images

References

External links

Census-designated places in Kern County, California
Populated places established in 1861
Census-designated places in California
1861 establishments in California